By an ordinance issued by the Government of Sweden, a number of days of the calendar year are designated as official flag flying days. This means that the Flag of Sweden is flown on all public flag poles and buildings. Hoisting of the Swedish flag on private flagpoles on these days is also strongly encouraged, but not mandatory.

Flying of the flag is in general governed by the sun, but there are guidelines specified by military tradition. The flag is hoisted at 8 AM in the summer and 9 AM in the winter, and is lowered by sunset but never later than 9 PM. In parts of Sweden north of the Arctic Circle, the sun does not rise at all for some weeks during winter. One example of handling this is the practice of the Infantry Regiment in Kiruna, which during this period flies the flag from 9 AM to 11.50 AM.

9 May is not an official Swedish flag day. It receives its status from being a flag day of the European Union of which Sweden is a member country. In Sweden, this is observed by flying the Swedish flag alongside the European Union flag on public flagpoles and buildings.

See also
Flag flying day
Public holidays in Sweden
Swedish festivities
Name days in Sweden
Du gamla, du fria
Flag flying days in Finland
Flag flying days in Norway

References

Swedish culture
 
Sweden